Cenni di Francesco di ser Cenni was an Italian Gothic painter active in Florence between 1369/1370 and 1415. His only signed work is the fresco of the True Cross at the Cappella della Croce di Giorno at the church of  San Francesco in Volterra, painted in 1410. A couple of dozen works have been attributed to Cenni di Francesco on the basis of a similarity of style with the fresco.

The fresco at the entrance to the Basilica of Santa Maria Novella in Florence is attributed to Cenni di Francesco as well, and it was presumably painted in the early 1390s, based on a comparison with the paintings of this period.

A Polyptych with Coronation of the Virgin and Saints (circa 1390) is on display in the Getty Museum in California.

References

Gothic painters
Painters from Florence
14th-century Italian painters
Italian male painters
15th-century Italian painters